Darwin William Duell (born George William Duell; August 30, 1923 – December 22, 2011) was an American actor and singer. He was known for his roles as Andrew McNair in the musical 1776, Jim Sefelt in the 1975 film One Flew Over the Cuckoo's Nest, and Johnny the Shoe Shine Guy on the 1982 crime comedy series Police Squad!. Described as a short, odd-looking character actor with a Shakespearean background, he had many minor roles in plays, films, and TV series. His last work was a cameo in the 2003 film How to Lose a Guy in 10 Days.

Early life and career
Duell was born in 1923 in Corinth, New York, to E. Janet (Harrington) and Leon George Duell, an employee of the International Paper Company. Sometime in his youth, his mother legally changed his name to Darwin William Duell.  Duell never cared for his first name and thus always went by his middle name, William. Duell graduated from the Green Mountain Junior College (now Green Mountain College) (Vermont), Illinois Wesleyan University, and Yale University. A theater scholarship at Green Mountain College is named after him. Duell served in the U.S. Navy during World War II.

He portrayed Congressional custodian Andrew McNair in the Broadway version of 1776, which made him the one actor who stayed throughout the entire run of the show and was never understudied; he also played the part in the 1972 film of the musical. In the 1997 Broadway revival of 1776 Duell was a replacement member of the cast, filling the role of Caesar Rodney after Michael McCormick took on the role of John Adams.  In 2010, he appeared in a one-night only staged reading of Evening Primrose by Stephen Sondheim.

Later life and death
Duell married his wife, Mary Barto, in 2004. Duell died of respiratory failure in December 2011.  He was 88.

Partial filmography

The Hustler (1961) – Billy (Louisville Hustler) (uncredited)
1776 (1972) – Andrew McNair, Congressional Custodian
Deadhead Miles (1973) – Auto Parts Salesman
Law and Disorder (1974)
The Happy Hooker (1975) – Meek Man
One Flew Over the Cuckoo's Nest (1975) – Jim Sefelt
King of the Gypsies (1978) – Funeral Home Director
Airplane! (1980) – Reporter #1 (uncredited)
A Stranger Is Watching (1982) – Derelict in Subway (uncredited)
Police Squad! (1982) – Johnny
Without a Trace (1983) – Polygraph operator
Grace Quigley (1984) – Mr. Harvey Jenkins
The Pope of Greenwich Village (1984) – Toll Booth Attendant #2
Mrs. Soffel (1984) – Lenny
The Beniker Gang (1985) – Postmaster Greaves
Seize the Day (1986) – Joey
Ironweed (1987) – Moose
Funny Farm (1988) – Old Character
Elvira, Mistress of the Dark (1988) – Lesley Meeker
Out of the Rain (1991) – Reverend
Me and Veronica (1993) – Harry
Trial by Jury (1994) – Jimmy
Palookaville (1995) – Money Truck Guard
Reckless (1995) – Roy
In & Out (1997) – Emmett Wilson
The Out-of-Towners (1999) – Lost Baggage Clerk
Cradle Will Rock (1999) – Butler
Advice from a Caterpillar (1999) – Hunter #2
How to Lose a Guy in 10 Days (2003) – Old Concession Worker (final film role)

References

External links 
 
 
 

Male actors from New York (state)
American male film actors
American male television actors
2011 deaths
1923 births
Illinois Wesleyan University alumni
People from Corinth, New York
Yale University alumni
Deaths from respiratory failure